Boletus viscidiceps is a species of porcini-like fungus native to Yunnan Province in southwestern China.

References

viscidiceps
Fungi of China
Fungi described in 2016